Qeshlaq-e Seyf ol Din (also Romanized as Qeshlāq-e Seyf ol Dīn and Qeshlāq-e Seyf ed Dīn; also known as Qeshlāq) is a village in Kandovan Rural District, Kandovan District, Meyaneh County, East Azerbaijan Province, Iran. At the 2006 census, its population was 306, in 54 families.

References 

Populated places in Meyaneh County